Yıldırım Ali Koç (born 2 April 1967) is a Turkish businessman. He is a third-generation member of Turkey's wealthiest Koç family and the youngest son of Rahmi Koç. On 3 June 2018, he became the 37th president of Fenerbahçe Sports Club.

Biography 
After finishing high school at Harrow School (1980–85), London, he received  his BA degree in Managerial Studies from Rice University (1985–89), Houston, Texas, followed by his MBA degree from Harvard Business School (1995–97).

In 1990-1991, he attended the management trainee program of American Express Bank. From 1992 to 1994, he was an analyst at Morgan Stanley. In 1997, he joined Koç Holding, and held various senior positions within the company. From 2006 to 2010, he was the president of corporate communication and information of the family group.

He was former board member of Süper Lig football club giant Fenerbahçe. He served his fourth two-year term as vice-president since Aziz Yıldırım came to power. Ali Koç is a Rotarian and a member of the Istanbul Open Sea Yacht Club and New York Yacht Club. Ali Koç currently serves on the Board of Directors of Endeavor Turkey, an international non-profit development organization that finds and supports high-impact entrepreneurs in emerging markets. He was elected the 37th Fenerbahçe Sports Club president on the third of June 2018, beating former president and candidate Aziz Yildirim with 77.6% of the votes for a three year long term.

In June 2022, he was awarded as Honorary Commander of the Order of the British Empire (CBE), for services to Trade and Investment between Britain and Turkey.

In June 2022, he was elected as the president of the Turkish Union of Clubs.

Private life 
Ali Koç married Nevbahar Demirağ in 2005. They have two children.

See also
 Koç family
 Koç Holding
 List of billionaires

External links
 Ali Koç at Koç Holding

References

 

1967 births
Living people
Yildirim Ali
Businesspeople from Istanbul
Fenerbahçe S.K. presidents
Fenerbahçe S.K. board members
People educated at Harrow School
Rice University alumni
Harvard Business School alumni
Turkish billionaires
Honorary Commanders of the Order of the British Empire